How Do You Dub? You Fight for Dub. You Plug Dub In. is the second EP by American dub reggae band De Facto. It was released on Restart Records, a record label founded by Jim Ward, Paul Hinojos and Silas Carter, soon after Megaton Shotblast. How Do You Dub? is a repackaged version of the band's eponymous debut release which came out in 1999 as a very limited vinyl pressing. It features a different track order as well as replaces "Drop" with a new track "Nux Vomica/Coaxialreturn" (the only one to feature contributions from keyboardist Ikey Owens).

Track listing 
 "Coaxial" – 1:43
 "Madagascar" – 3:02
 "Agua Mineral" – 2:04
 "Defacto" – 1:58
 "1024" – 0:27
 "Thick Vinyl Plate" – 3:04
 "Radio Rebelde" – 2:34
 "Nux Vomica/Coaxialreturn" – 4:20

Personnel 
Omar Rodríguez-López – bass
Cedric Bixler-Zavala – drums, keyboards, samples
Jeremy Ward – melodica, voice, drum machine, sound manipulation
Isaiah Ikey Owens – keyboards & electronic beats on track 8

References 

De Facto (band) albums
2001 EPs